Youssef Idrissi (born 19 January 1988 in Avignon) is a French footballer who currently plays as a midfielder for Aurillac FCA.

Idrissi started his career at Saint-Étienne.

References

External links

1988 births
Living people
French footballers
FC Lokomotiv 1929 Sofia players
FC Etar 1924 Veliko Tarnovo players
French sportspeople of Moroccan descent
Association football midfielders
Expatriate footballers in Bulgaria
First Professional Football League (Bulgaria) players
Andrézieux-Bouthéon FC players
FC Aurillac Arpajon Cantal Auvergne players
US Feurs players
Sportspeople from Avignon
Footballers from Provence-Alpes-Côte d'Azur
French expatriate sportspeople in Bulgaria